The EDDA submachine gun (Spanish:Pistola Ametralladora EDDA) is a submachine gun of Argentine origin.

Overview
The EDDA submachine gun is a blowback operated weapon and is chambered in the .22 WMR round. It has select fire capabilities and is fed by a 30-round box magazine. To improve accuracy, it has a retractable stock and an optional Tasco red dot IR sight is mounted on the top cover.

See also
List of submachine guns

References

External links
 EDDA submachine gun picture on Flickr

Submachine guns
Submachine guns of Argentina